The Stuoraxidae is an extinct taxonomic family of fossil sea snails, marine gastropod mollusks in the informal group Lower Heterobranchia.

References